Dhivehi Latin or Maldivian Latin, known colloquially as Malé Latin or Nasiri Latin, is a Latin Maldivian alphabet briefly mandated in the Maldives from 1976, but the country reverted to the native Thaana and Arabic alphabets in 1978. Maldivian Latin is still widely used in non-academic literature for romanizing Maldivian.

History
Maldivians traditionally used two alphabets simultaneously, the Tāna script for Maldivian and the Arabic script for Arabic. All learned Maldivians were well versed in the Quran and Arabic was the first script they learned in childhood. This was followed by their local script, Thaana, in which there were not many books printed, but that was important for official use. Therefore, the primary knowledge of the letters was called Arabitāna.

Toward the mid-1970s, during President Ibrahim Nasir's tenure, telex machines were introduced by the Maldivian Government in the local administration. The new telex equipment was viewed as a great progress, however the local Thaana script was deemed to be an obstacle because messages on the telex machines could be written only in the Latin script.

Following this, a Latin transliteration not done by experts in linguistics was swiftly approved by the Maldive government in 1976 and was quickly implemented by the administration. Booklets were printed and dispatched to all atoll and island offices, as well as schools and merchant liners.

This official Latin script has been criticized by several scholars because the transliteration of vowels did not follow the consistency of the Thaana alphabet and was more difficult to master for Maldivian learners. In the Maldivian alphabet there is one single diacritical sign (fili) for 'a' 'e' 'i' and 'u', and this single sign is repeated when the sound is lengthened. In the new romanization only one of the short vowels is consistent with the way of the traditional script "aa", but most long vowels "oo", "ee", "ey" and "oa" are pronounced as in English. However, only a very small group of Maldivians belonging to the elite were familiar with written English in 1977. 
 
Anthropologist Clarence Maloney notes that the use of th and dh to represent unaspirated dental consonants but lh for retroflex l is confusing and misleading, as in IAST, the most common transcription method for Indic languages, the first two would be read as aspirated consonants and the latter, which is instead a retroflex, as an aspirated "l".

The new romanization also used aberrant combinations of letters and apostrophes for some Arabic sounds, effectively ignoring the Arabic transliterations accepted in academic circles worldwide. Maldivian officials were used to read Arabic since childhood, as the religious education had precedence over the secular one. In documents which contained only one script, it became harder to identify religious Arabic quotations, a fact which was important because they had to be read in a different tone.

The Thaana script was reinstated by President Maumoon Abdul Gayoom shortly after he took power in 1978.

Note: Some Arabic sounds were written as they are pronounced by Maldivians, and they are shown in curly brackets in this table.

Being able to master and combine both Arabic and Thaana was a prerequisite to be a Katību, Mudimu or Atoll chief. The weekly Khutubā or Friday prayer sermon, was sent by the government to every inhabited island, and it was written in both scripts, because it contained texts both in Arabic and Maldivian languages.

Even other documents of the time, like private letters, astrological writings or storybooks contained texts, in which both scripts were present, because not only quotations from Islamic religious texts, but also certain loanwords of Arabic origin (for example the local words for "special", "rule", "important", "declaration",  and "service" among others) were written in the Arabic script.

At the time of the romanization every island's officials were required to use only one script and they became illiterate overnight. From their point of view it was a traumatic period and these old government officers were indeed relieved when the romanization was revoked.

See also
Romanization of Maldivian
Dhivehi writing systems

Notes

Footnotes

References
H. C. P. Bell, Excerpta Maldiviana. Reprint Colombo 1922/35 edn. Asian Educational Services. New Delhi 1999
Divehi Bahuge Qawaaaid. Vols 1 to 5. Ministry of Education. Malé 1977.
Divehi Tārīkhah Au Alikameh. Divehi Bahāi Tārikhah Khidmaiykurā Qaumī Markazu. Reprint 1958 edn. Malé 1990.
Divehīnge Tarika 3 vana bai. "Divehīnge bas". Divehi Bahāi Tārikhah Khidmaiykurā Qaumī Markazu. Malé 2004.
Gair, James W. & Cain, Bruce D. (1996), "Divehi Writing" in Peter T. Daniels & William Bright, ed., The World's Writing Systems, New York: Oxford University Press, pp. 564–568. .
Haywood J.A. & Nahmad H.M. A New Arabic Grammar of the Written Language. London 1990
Xavier Romero-Frias, The Maldive Islanders, A Study of the Popular Culture of an Ancient Ocean Kingdom''. Barcelona 1999, 
https://thatmaldivesblog.wordpress.com/2017/12/22/shaviyani-adventures-in-phonology/
https://www.liyuntherin.org/archives/3096

Maldivian culture
Romanization
Maldivian language